The El Arco mine is a planned large copper mine located in the north-west of Mexico in Baja California. El Arco represents one of the largest copper reserve in Mexico and in the world having estimated reserves of 1.5 billion tonnes of ore grading 0.41% copper. As of 2021, the mine is planned to produce 190,000 tons of copper a year starting in 2027.

See also
 Buenavista mine
 El Pilar mine

References 

Copper mines in Mexico